Youbou is a community located on the north shore of Cowichan Lake, west of Duncan and a 15-minute (13 km) drive west of the community of Lake Cowichan, Canada. The former mill town on Vancouver Island provides a public beach and extensive recreational opportunities, including fishing, boating, and hiking.

Youbou is named after two employees of the Empire Lumber Company which operated the first sawmill there. Mr. Yount was the general manager and Mr. Bouton was the president.

Youbou is one of several towns in the Cowichan Valley with significant South Asian Canadian (primarily Sikh-Canadian) community history for over 130 years, gaining notoriety in the forestry industry at local sawmills from the early 20th century until the 1980s.

References

 Town of Youbou information
 
 Cowichan Valley Regional District

Unincorporated settlements in British Columbia
Populated places in the Cowichan Valley Regional District
Designated places in British Columbia